Datin Vivy Sofinas Yusof is a Malaysian entrepreneur and the co-founder of FashionValet and The dUCk Group.

Career 
A law graduate from London School of Economics (LSE), Vivy is the Chief Creative Officer at FashionValet, a fashion e-commerce company founded by herself and her husband, Dato' Fadzarudin Shah Anuar (mostly known as Fadza), in 2010 when they were 23 years old. Now a multi-million dollar company with 150 employees and carrying 500 fashion brands, FashionValet has offices and warehouses in Malaysia, Jakarta and Singapore, and ships parcels daily to customers all over the world.

Vivy's awards and achievements include:

 Entrepreneur Par Excellence by Malaysia Tatler Ball Awards, 2019
 YouTube Silver Play Button Award, 2019
 Top 40 Under 40 by Prestige Malaysia, 2018
 Generation T by Tatler Malaysia, 2018
 Named “Women Icon of Malaysia” by the Ministry of Women, presented by the Prime Minister of Malaysia, 2018
 Young Global Leaders List by the World Economic Forum, 2018
 Vivy was made a case study in Malaysia's STPM national examination, 2018
 Asia's Top 50 Rising Tech Stars by Tatler Malaysia, 2017
 Generation T by Tatler Malaysia, 2017
 Member of Blue Ocean Corporate Council, an NBOS initiative led by Tan Sri Dato' Sri Abdul Wahid bin Omar, 2017
 Forbes’ 30 Under 30 Asia list, 2017
 Selected as an Endeavor Entrepreneur, 2017
 Amazing Woman 2017 List by Women's Weekly, 2017
 Young Entrepreneur Award at the ASEAN@15 Achievement Awards, 2017
 Anugerah Instafamous Inspirasi,  Hurr.TV, 2017
 Social Media Influencer Award, InTrend Malaysia, 2017
 Young Entrepreneur Award recipient, presented by the Queen of Malaysia at Tribute to Women's Award, 2016

Vivy has also graced the covers of several high-profile magazines in Malaysia - HerWorld, Prestige, and Tatler. She was also named a Friend of Louis Vuitton, being the first hijabi woman to be honored with the title.

Well-acclaimed as one of Malaysia's top bloggers with 250K hits monthly on her blog, Proudduck. Vivy is also a social media icon with over a million followers on Instagram. Recently, in 2017, Vivy started venturing into vlogging, where she launched her own channel on YouTube, serving as the visual platform to share her life insights with her followers on regular basis.

She regularly attends fashion events in the Southeast Asia region as a fashion expert and social media influencer. Vivy has also participated for two years as a judge for AirAsia's Runway Ready Designer Search, where she and a panel of judges travel throughout Southeast Asia in search for the next big name in Asian fashion.

Vivy and her husband, Fadza, were officially welcomed into Endeavor - a global organisation that "selects, mentors and accelerates high-impact entrepreneurs". Fadza and Vivy are the first Malays to be a part of Endeavor team.

Vivy and her husband Fadza have also launched 3 fundraisers to help frontliners in Malaysia fight the COVID-19 Pandemic. In total, they raised over RM 2.1 Million for the cause, making this one of the biggest fundraisers in the country. In addition to that, Vivy and Fadza also launched an initiative called the FV Bazaar to help provide a platform for f&b vendors to promote their businesses during the pandemic. 4500 vendors joined the platform making this initiative a huge success.

Television 
In 2012, Vivy and Fadzarudin attained first place on Make The Pitch, a reality television show where the duo won RM1million investment by MyEG Services Bhd, for a 30% stake in the company. Vivy later starred in Astro Ria's reality television series, Love, Vivy.

Love, Vivy revolves around the life of one of Malaysia's leading faces in fashion – juggling her work, keeping on top of their leading online retail empire FashionValet and her scarf brand, dUCk, as well as her family duties as daughter, wife, and mother to four children's; Daniel Azim Shah, Mariam Iman Shah, Sarah Ilham Shah and Idris Ali Shah.

On 21 February 2017, the second season of Love, Vivy was aired on Astro Ria.

References

Living people
People from Selangor
Malaysian Muslims
Malaysian businesspeople
Malaysian women in business
Malaysian people of Malay descent
Malaysian socialites
Social media influencers
Year of birth missing (living people)